South River is a  river in the U.S. state of Iowa.

It flows into the Des Moines River and so subsequently into Lake Red Rock.

Recreation
South River offers many sources of leisure activities such as fishing and swimming. The river holds catfish (of all sorts), bass, bluegill, carp, gar, drum, and many other less common species. It is also a great place to go swimming in the summer.

See also
List of rivers of Iowa

References

Rivers of Iowa
Bodies of water of Warren County, Iowa